Steven R. DiSalvo (born January 28, 1962) is an American academic administrator serving as the seventh President of Endicott College in Beverly, Massachusetts.

Early life and education 
DiSalvo was raised in Queens, New York, the only son of Salvatore and Arline DiSalvo. He was raised and educated as a Roman Catholic. DiSalvo attended Fordham University, a Jesuit university, where he earned his Bachelor of Science in psychology, Master of Business Administration in marketing, and Ph.D. in educational leadership.

Career 
Prior to assuming his position at Endicott College, DiSalvo served as the President of Saint Anselm College from 2013 to 2019 and Marian University from 2010 to 2013. On October 12, 2018, Saint Anselm College announced that Dr. DiSalvo will step down as president in June 2019.

On March 27, 2019, the Endicott College Board of Trustees announced that DiSalvo would become the college's seventh president, beginning July 1, 2019.

Since relocating to Boston’s North Shore, DiSalvo has served on the boards of the New England Council, Austin Preparatory School, Life Sciences Consortium of the North Shore, Cummings Foundation, and as the Chair of the Commonwealth Coast Conference. He and his wife Eileen have three sons.

Notes and references 

1962 births
Living people
Fordham University alumni
Heads of universities and colleges in the United States